George Grayson may refer to:
George Enoch Grayson (1833/34–1912), English architect
George W. Grayson (1938–2015),  American academic and politician from Virginia 
George Washington Grayson (1843–1920), American Indian (Muscogee) town founder and Confederate soldier